West Marden is a hamlet in the Chichester district of West Sussex, England. It lies on the B2146 road 5 miles (8.2 km) north of Emsworth. It is in the civil parish of Compton.

External links

Villages in West Sussex